The 1993 NBA Playoffs was the postseason tournament of the National Basketball Association's 1992–93 season. The tournament concluded with the Eastern Conference champion Chicago Bulls defeating the Western Conference champion Phoenix Suns 4 games to 2 in the NBA Finals. Michael Jordan was named NBA Finals MVP for the third straight year. This was the Suns' second Western Conference title; they made their first NBA Finals appearance since 1976, losing to the Boston Celtics.

The Knicks–Pacers rivalry started in their first-round encounter, which New York won, 3–1. But it wasn't until the next two meetings (1994 and 1995) that the rivalry became even more intense, particularly due to Reggie Miller's heroics in the Garden that made him a household name and Indiana legitimate contenders in the East.

The Charlotte Hornets made their playoff debut. Their opening-round series versus Boston was also last time the Celtics made the playoffs with Kevin McHale, who retired after the series, and Robert Parish, who left as a free agent. Game 1 of the series was the final game of Reggie Lewis' career, as he collapsed during the first quarter and did not play for the rest of the series; he died in July of a heart attack.

Game 7 of the Western Conference Finals saw the Suns attempt sixty-four free throws while connecting on fifty-seven of them, both NBA postseason records.

Sportswriter Bill Simmons called the 1993 post-season the best in NBA history.

Bracket

First round

Eastern Conference first round

(1) New York Knicks vs. (8) Indiana Pacers

 John Starks is ejected after headbutting Reggie Miller.

This was the first playoff meeting between the Pacers and the Knicks.

(2) Chicago Bulls vs. (7) Atlanta Hawks

 Michael Jordan hits the half-court shot at the buzzer to end the first half.

This was the third playoff meeting between these two teams, with the Hawks winning both meetings.

(3) Cleveland Cavaliers vs. (6) New Jersey Nets

 Bernard King's final NBA game.

 Maurice Cheeks and Dražen Petrović's final NBA game; Petrović dies a month later in a car crash.

This was the second playoff meeting between these two teams, with the Cavaliers winning the first meeting.

(4) Boston Celtics vs. (5) Charlotte Hornets

 Celtics forward Reggie Lewis's final NBA game, he collapses on the court and did not play for the rest of the series; he dies 3 months later from a heart defect.

 Xavier McDaniel hits the game-tying jumper with 25.8 seconds left in regulation to force the first OT; Kevin McHale hits the game-tying jumper with 6 seconds left in the first OT to force the second OT.

 Alonzo Mourning hits the series-winning shot with 4 tenths left; also Kevin McHale's final NBA game.

This was the first playoff meeting between the Celtics and the Hornets.

Western Conference first round

(1) Phoenix Suns vs. (8) Los Angeles Lakers

 Dan Majerle hits the game-tying shot with 13.6 seconds left to force OT; After losing the first two games of the series,  at the post game press conference Suns head coach Paul Westphal said that they would go to LA and win the next two games and then come back to Phoenix and win game 5, "and everyone will say what a great series it was."

This was the eighth playoff meeting between these two teams, with the Lakers winning six of the first seven meetings.

(2) Houston Rockets vs. (7) Los Angeles Clippers

This was the first playoff meeting between the Rockets and the Clippers.

(3) Seattle SuperSonics vs. (6) Utah Jazz

This was the second playoff meeting between these two teams, with the Jazz winning the first meeting.

(4) Portland Trail Blazers vs. (5) San Antonio Spurs

 Sean Elliott hits the game-tying lay-up with 1:27 left to force OT.

This was the second playoff meeting between these two teams, with the Trail Blazers winning the first meeting.

Conference semifinals

Eastern Conference semifinals

(1) New York Knicks vs. (5) Charlotte Hornets

 Alonzo Mourning hits the game-tying shot with 30.9 seconds left in regulation to force the first OT, then hits the game-tying free throws with 12 seconds left in the first OT to force the second OT)

This was the first playoff meeting between the Hornets and the Knicks.

(2) Chicago Bulls vs. (3) Cleveland Cavaliers

 Michael Jordan hits the series-winning shot at the buzzer against Cleveland for the second time in his career.

This was the fourth playoff meeting between these two teams, with the Bulls winning the first three meetings.

Western Conference semifinals

(1) Phoenix Suns vs. (5) San Antonio Spurs

 Charles Barkley hits the series-winning shot with 1.8 seconds left, also the Spurs played their final game at the HemisFair Arena before moving to the Alamodome the following season.

This was the second playoff meeting between these two teams, with the Suns winning the first meeting.

(2) Houston Rockets vs. (3) Seattle SuperSonics

 Ricky Pierce hits the game-tying shot with 23.9 seconds left to force OT.

This was the fourth playoff meeting between these two teams, with the SuperSonics winning the first three meetings.

Conference finals

Eastern Conference finals

(1) New York Knicks vs. (2) Chicago Bulls

 John Starks' famous dunk on Horace Grant and Michael Jordan with 47.3 seconds left in the game.

 Michael Jordan scores 54 points, the most against the Knicks in a playoff game by any player.

 B. J. Armstrong hits the clutch 3 with 1:16 left; Charles Smith gets blocked 4 straight times by Horace Grant, Michael Jordan, and Scottie Pippen at the end of the game.

This was the fifth playoff meeting between these two teams, with the Bulls winning the first four meetings.

Western Conference finals

(1) Phoenix Suns vs. (3) Seattle SuperSonics

This was the third playoff meeting between these two teams, with each team winning one series.

NBA Finals: (W1) Phoenix Suns vs. (E2) Chicago Bulls

 The team with home-court advantage in the NBA Finals loses the first two games at home for the first time ever.

 This game marks the second time in NBA Finals history that a game goes to triple OT after game 5 of the 1976 NBA Finals (in which the Suns lost to the Boston Celtics); Horace Grant hits the game-tying 3-point play with 1:33 left in regulation to force the first OT; Tom Chambers hits the game-tying lay-up with 50.9 seconds left in the first OT to force the second OT; Dan Majerle hits the game-tying shot with 3.2 seconds left in the second OT to force the third OT.

 The last NBA Finals game in Chicago Stadium.

 John Paxson hits the title-winning 3 with 3.9 seconds left; Horace Grant then blocks Kevin Johnson just before the buzzer.

This was the first playoff meeting between the Bulls and the Suns.

Notes
 The league's best team during the regular season, the Phoenix Suns, were on the verge of playoff elimination after losing the first two games at home against the No. 8 seeded Los Angeles Lakers. However, they recovered to win Games 3 and 4 in Los Angeles to tie the series at 2–2. In Game 5, Dan Majerie hit a three-pointer to force overtime. The Suns eventually pulled away to win Game 5, 112–104, at home to avoid becoming the first No. 1 seed to lose to a #8 seed. This would happen the following postseason, when the No. 8 Denver Nuggets defeated the #1 Seattle SuperSonics 3–2 (the Nuggets came back from a 2–0 series deficit to pull it off).
 Both #5 seeds, Charlotte and San Antonio, beat their No. 4 seeded opponent in the first round.
 The fifth-year Charlotte Hornets made their playoff debut, and became the first of the 1988/89 expansion teams (Charlotte, Orlando, Minnesota, and Miami) to win a playoff series, beating Boston 3–1.
 The New York Knicks took a 2–0 series lead over the Chicago Bulls in the Conference Finals. However, headlines in New York papers and tabloids angered and energized Bulls superstar Michael Jordan, who torched the Knicks for 54 points in Game 4  after shooting 3–18 in Game 3 to even up the series. This performance surpassed Sam Jones's 51-point game against the 1967 Knicks as the most points ever scored by a player against the Knicks in a playoff game. The Bulls went to Madison Square Garden, won Game 5 97–94, and clinched the series at home in Game 6 with a 96–88 victory.
 Celtics' star Reggie Lewis fainted on the court during Game 1 against the Hornets. He briefly returned to the game before sitting out the rest of the series. He died less than three months later from a heart condition.
 After the Suns defeated the Sonics in Game 7 of the Western Conference Finals, there were complaints about the free throw comparison between the two teams.
 Game 6 of the Suns–Spurs series was the last game ever played at the HemisFair Arena.
 The Cavaliers defeated the Nets in the Eastern Conference First Round, which was their last win in a playoff series until 2006. Game 5 of that series was also the last game played by Dražen Petrović, who died in a car accident five weeks later.

References

External links
Basketball-Reference.com's 1993 NBA Playoffs page

National Basketball Association playoffs
Playoffs
Sports in Portland, Oregon
GMA Network television specials

fi:NBA-kausi 1992–1993#Pudotuspelit